Henry Grace (March 20, 1907 – September 16, 1983) was an American set decorator. He won an Oscar and was nominated for twelve more in the category Best Art Direction. As an actor, he had a role as Dwight D. Eisenhower, whom he strongly resembled, in The Longest Day.

Selected filmography
Grace won an Academy Award for Best Art Direction and was nominated for twelve more:

Won
 Gigi (1958)

Nominated
 Blackboard Jungle (1955)
 North by Northwest (1959)
 Cimarron (1960)
 The Wonderful World of the Brothers Grimm (1962)
 Mutiny on the Bounty (1962)
 Period of Adjustment (1962)
 How the West Was Won (1962)
 Twilight of Honor (1963)
 The Unsinkable Molly Brown (1964)
 The Americanization of Emily (1964)
 A Patch of Blue (1965)
 Mister Buddwing (1966)

References

External links

1907 births
1983 deaths
American set decorators
Best Art Direction Academy Award winners